Sunčane Skale 2000 is the sixth edition of Sunčane Skale, an annual pop festival held in Montenegro.

Day 3 - Pjesma ljeta

Sunčane Skale
2000 in Montenegro
2000 music festivals